Arjomand (also Romanized as Arjmand and Arjomad; formerly, Arzaman (Persian: اَرزَمان), also Romanized as Arzamān) is a city in, and the capital of, Arjomand District of Firuzkuh County, Tehran province, Iran. At the 2006 census, its population was 1,688 in 474 households. The following census in 2011 counted 1,114 people in 385 households. The latest census in 2016 showed a population of 1,124 people in 406 households.

References 

Firuzkuh County

Cities in Tehran Province

Populated places in Tehran Province

Populated places in Firuzkuh County